Route 344 is a collector road in the Canadian province of Nova Scotia.

It is located in Guysborough County and connects Auld's Cove at Trunk 4 with Boylston at Trunk 16.

Communities
Auld's Cove
Mulgrave
Pirate Harbour
Steep Creek
Middle Melford
Sand Point
Hadleyville-(formerly Oyster Ponds)
St. Francis Harbour - (formerly Goose Harbour)
Manassette Lake
Port Shoreham
Manchester
Boylston

Parks
Port Shoreham Beach Provincial Park

History

The section of the Collector Highway 344 from Auld's Cove and Mulgrave was designated as Trunk Highway 44.

See also
List of Nova Scotia provincial highways

References

Nova Scotia provincial highways
Roads in Guysborough County, Nova Scotia